José Juscelino dos Santos Rezende Filho (born 6 November 1984) is a Brazilian physician and politician who has served as Minister of Communications in the cabinet of President Luiz Inácio Lula da Silva since 2023.  Affiliated with the Brazil Union party, he has served as a federal deputy for Maranhão since 2015.

Early life and education 

Born in São Luís, the capital of Maranhão, Juscelino is the son of former state deputy Juscelino Rezende. He received a degree in medicine from the University Center of Maranhão (UNICEUMA) in 2010.

Career 
As a doctor, Filho is specialized in radiology and diagnostic imaging. He formerly served as an assistant secretary in the Maranhão government.

Federal Deputy from Maranhão 
In 2014, Juscelino Filho was elected federal deputy from Maranhão. On 17 April 2016, he voted in favor of impeaching President Dilma Rousseff. In April 2017, he voted in favor of labor reform.

Minister of Communications 
In December 2022, it was announced that he would serve as Minister of Communications in the second Lula Cabinet.

References 

1984 births
Brazilian politicians
Living people
People from Maranhão
Brazil Union politicians
Government ministers of Brazil